José Joaquim Emerico Lobo de Mesquita (12 October 1746 – April 1805) was a Brazilian composer, music teacher, conductor and organist.

Life
Emerico was born at Vila do Príncipe (now Serro), in Minas Gerais State, Brazil. His parents José Lobo de Mesquita and Joaquina Emerenciana gave him a liberal education. He received his first music lessons (organ and music theory) from Father Manuel da Costa Dantas, who was organist and choirmaster at the church Nossa Senhora da Conceição in Serro. Soon after 1776 he went to Arraial do Tijuco (now Diamantina) to become organist and conductor at the cathedral Santo Antônio of Diamantina. On 17 January 1789 he entered the religious order Ordem Terceira de Nossa Senhora do Carmo. He founded a music school in this city and was appointed teacher of the art of music. In 1798 he worked in Vila Rica (now Ouro Preto) for the city mayor, and was also organist and choirmaster at the church Nossa Senhora do Pilar. He had a quarrel with the mayor and left for Rio de Janeiro, where he became organist of the Ordem Terceira do Carmo until his death, in April 1805.

Lobo de Mesquita was an important representative of the so-called Escola de Compositores da Capitania das Minas do Ouro (Composers' School of the Gold Mines Region). He was known for his virtuoso organ playing and art of improvisation.

Compositions

Sacred music
1778 Missa para Quarta-Feira de Cinzas, for soloists, mixed choir, cello and organ
1779 Regina caeli laetare
1780 Missa em fá nº 2, for 4 voices and strings
1782 Missa em mi bemol nº 1, for soloists, mixed choir and strings
 Kyrie eleison
 Christe eleison
 Et in terra pax
 Laudamus te
 Gratias
 Domine Deus
 Qui tollis
 Suscipe
 Qui sedes
 Quoniam
 Cum Sancto Spiritu
1782 Dominica in Palmis
1782 Ofício e Missa para Domingo de Ramos
1783 Tercio, for 4 voices and strings
1783 Tractus para o Sábado Santo
 Cantemus Domino
 Vinea facta est
 Attende cælum
 Sicut cervus
1783 Vésperas de Sábado Santo
1787 Antiphona de Nossa Senhora
1787 Salve Regina
Antífonas para Quarta e Quinta-feira Santas
Antífonas para Quarta, Quinta e Sexta-feira Santas
Ária ao Pregador - Ave Regina
Ave Regina coelorum
Beata Mater
Credo em dó, for 4 voices and strings
Credo em fá
Christus factus est e Ofertório
Diffusa est gratia, concert for soloists, mixed choir and strings
Domingo da Ressurreição
Heu Domine, para a procissão do Enterro do Senhor
Heus, para a Procissão do Enterro do Senhor
In honorem Beatae Mariae (Ladainha)
In pacem in idipsum
Ladainha alternada 
Ladainha de Nossa Senhora do Carmo 
Ladainha do Senhor Bom Jesus de Matosinhos
Laudate Dominum, para o Sábado de Aleluia
Matinas de Natal 
Magnificat 
Magnificat alternado 
Memento a quatro, em sol menor
Missa concertada e Credo 
Missa de Sábado Santo e Magnificat
Missa de Santa Cecília 
Missa de Réquiem
Novena das Mercês 
Novena de Nossa Senhora da Conceição 
Novena de Nossa Senhora do Rosário 
Novena de São Francisco de Assis 
Novena de São José
Ofício das violetas 
Officium defunctorum
Ofício e Missa de Defuntos
Ofício de Semana Santa, for 4 voices and strings
Ofício de defuntos ("Ofício das violetas"), for 4 voices and strings
Ofício de defuntos nº 2, for soloists, mixed choir, cello and organ
Paixão, Bradados e Adoração da Cruz, para Sexta-feira Santa
Procissão de Ramos - Cum appropinquaret
Responsório de Santo Antônio - Si quaeris miracula
Salmo nº 112 - Laudate Pueri
Setenário de Nossa Senhora das Dores
Sequência Stabat Mater
Te Deum, for 4 voices and strings
Te Deum, em lá menor
Te Deum em ré

Works for organ
Difusa est Gratia Tércio
Domine, tu mihi lavas pedes

Bibliography
Jozef Robijns, Miep Zijlstra: Algemene muziek enciclopedie, Haarlem: De Haan, (1979)-1984, 
Vasco Mariz: História da Música no Brasil, 6ª edição ampliada e atualizada; Rio de Janeiro : Editora Nova Fronteira, 2005. 550 p., 
Vasco Mariz: História da Música no Brasil, Rio de Janeiro: Editora Civilização Brasileira, 1994. 
Vasco Mariz: História da Música no Brasil (Coleção Retratos do Brasil), Rio de Janeiro: Editora Civilizaçāo Brasileira, 1981. 331 p.,
Miguel Fischer, Martha Furman Schleifer, John M. Furman: Latin American classical composers - A biographical dictionary, Lanham, Md: Scarecrow Press, Inc., 1996, 407 p., 
Hildred Roach: Black American music : past and present, 2nd Revised edition, Malabar, Florida: Krieger Publishing Company, 1992, 390 p., 
Hildred Roach: Black American music. Past and present, Vol. II, Malabar, Florida: Robert E. Krieger, 1985, 
Ary Vasconcelos: Raízes da música popular brasileira (1500-1889), São Paulo: Livraria Martins Editora, 1991, 324 p., 
Ary Vasconcelos: Raízes da música popular brasileira (1500-1889), São Paulo: Livraria Martins Editora, 1977. 362 p.
Heitor Geraldo Magella Combat: Um "Magnificat" de J.J. Emerico Lobo de Mesquita (1746-1805). Pesquisa sobre cópias encontradas em Cássia-M.G., em 1960, II. Encontro Nacional de Pesquisa em Música. Belo Horizonte 1986. S. 67-87.
Marcos Antônio Marcondes: Enciclopédia da música brasileira: erudita, folclórica e popular, São Paulo: Art Editora, 1977
Francisco Curt Lange: Os compositores na Capitania Geral das Minas Gerais, Marília, 1965, 111 p.
Maria Luíza de Queiroz Amâncio dos Santos: Suplemento biográfico dos músicos que influíram em nossa cultura musical do XVI ao XIX século, in: Origem e evolução da música em Portugal e sua influência no Brasil, Comissão Brasileira dos Centenários de Portugal, 1942, 343 p.

External links

1746 births
1805 deaths
Brazilian classical composers
Brazilian male composers
Brazilian conductors (music)
Brazilian organists
Classical-period composers
18th-century keyboardists
Male classical composers
19th-century male musicians